"Diamonds Are a Girl's Best Friend" is a jazz song introduced by Carol Channing in the original Broadway production of Gentlemen Prefer Blondes (1949), with music by Jule Styne and lyrics by Leo Robin.

Marilyn Monroe version

American actress and singer Marilyn Monroe performed the song in the 1953 film Gentlemen Prefer Blondes.  Monroe's character, Lorelei Lee, has been followed on a transatlantic ocean liner by a detective hired by her fiancé's father, who wants assurance that she is not marrying purely for money.  He is informed of compromising pictures taken with a British diamond mine owner and cancels her letter of credit before she arrives in France, requiring her to work in a nightclub to survive.  Her fiancé arrives at the cabaret to see her perform this song, about exploiting men for riches.  Diamonds are an element in another story line in the film, in which Lorelei is given a diamond tiara by the mine owner, in gratitude for her recovering the photographs.  In a later scene, Jane Russell, who played opposite Monroe, sang "Diamonds Are a Girl's Best Friend" in court, while pretending to be Lorelei.

Most of the song in the film is Monroe's own voice and sources differ on how much help she had. The American Film Institute, TCM, and a biography of director Howard Hawks state the only help she had was for the brief high-pitched introduction to the song (usually not included in singles), which was sung by Gloria Wood. However, a 2007 article in The New York Times recounting the career of famous ghost singer Marni Nixon claims Nixon dubbed the phrase "These rocks don't lose their shape." George Chakiris can be spotted as a member of the admiring male chorus.

The number was later re-shot in CinemaScope, to be used as part of a CinemaScope demonstration held on the Fox lot in March 1953. Producer Darryl F. Zanuck told Daily Variety that it only took  hours to shoot the number in CinemaScope versus four days for the original film version. The public finally saw the CinemaScope version ten years later when it closed Fox's documentary tribute to Marilyn, but this has not been released on DVD or VHS.

Influence
Monroe's rendition of the song was ranked the 12th best film song of the century by the American Film Institute.

Monroe's performance has been referenced by entertainers ranging from Madonna and Kylie Minogue to Geri Halliwell and Anna Nicole Smith. The music video for Madonna's "Material Girl" specifically employs a similar set and costumes for the singer and her male dancers. The song was sampled by Megan Thee Stallion and Normani in 2020 for "Diamonds", with the music video featuring a set and costumes evoking Monroe's film performance. Monroe's vocals can also be heard in the background throughout the song.

Moulin Rouge! version 

The song is also featured in the 2001 film Moulin Rouge!, in which it is sung principally by Nicole Kidman in the role of Satine, the (fictional) star performer of the famous Moulin Rouge nightclub in Paris, at the turn of the 20th century. This film version is technically a musical adaptation that director Baz Luhrmann titled "Sparkling Diamonds". Although it consists almost entirely of an adaptation of "Diamonds Are a Girl's Best Friend", this version differs from the lyrics in Gentlemen Prefer Blondes in several ways. For example, it does not include the name Harry Winston in the chant of famous jewelers; rather, Moulin Rouge founder Charles Zidler's name was changed to Harold in the film, so his name replaces Winston's in the song as "Harry Zidler".  Black Starr & Frost-Gorham was known by that name only after 1925, but instead of using their 1875-1925 name of "Black Starr & Frost", their name was replaced in the Luhrmann film by nonsense words (understood by many listeners as "Ross Cole;" in the 2002 DVD release, the words printed in the text captioning are "Black Star, Roscor"). And the potentially anachronistic line "help you at the Automat" was altered in the Luhrmann film to "help you feed your pussycat." Additionally, a lyrical snippet from Madonna's song "Material Girl" was worked into this adaptation of the song.

Other versions 
 Ethel Merman recorded the song in 1950.
 Jo Stafford recorded the song in 1950.
 Lena Horne recorded the song in 1958, for her album Give the Lady What She Wants.
 Della Reese recorded the song in 1960, for her album Cha Cha Cha.
 Julie London recorded the song in 1961.
 Eartha Kitt recorded the song in 1962.
 Carol Channing recorded the song again in 1974 for the musical Lorelei, a revised version of Gentlemen Prefer Blondes.
 Bertice Reading recorded the song in 1979.
 In 1980, an episode of the British comedy-drama series Minder has a play on words titled "Diamonds Are a Girl's Worst Enemy".
 Emmylou Harris recorded a country/rock version in 1983, for her album White Shoes.
 The 1986 Herb Albert single Diamonds, which feature Janet Jackson on lead vocals, contains the "Diamond's are a girl's best friend" refrain within the lyric.
 Tina Martin & The Wild Side recorded a music video and 12" Vinyl for this song titled Diamonds in 1990 on The Wildside Label
 Thalía performed this song in 1991, on Spanish television.
 Jennifer Saunders and Dawn French, dressed as Marilyn Monroe and Jane Russell, respectively, parodied the number in their 1993 BBC special Gentlemen Prefer French & Saunders.
 In the first episode of the 1995 British TV Mini-Series She's Out, the character Connie Stephens (Zoe Heyes) sings a part of the song and dances in the mirror to it. She bears a resemblance to Marilyn Monroe and also states that Monroe was an inspiration to her.
 Kylie Minogue performed this song in 1995. She also performed the song in 1999, dressed as Marilyn Monroe for the opening of 20th Century Fox's Australian Studios. In 2007, she recorded another version for her film White Diamond. 
 Anna Nicole Smith recorded the song in 1998. The single went on to reach the top 100 dance singles in France.
 In 2007, Beyoncé performed an updated version for Giorgio Armani's new fragrance Emporio Armani Diamonds in an ad directed by Jake Nava and titled "Can You Resist?".
 Wendi Peters performed a version for BBC Children in Need on November 16, 2007, adding, "I am a Material Girl" halfway through, then returning to the main song.
 Nicole Scherzinger performed a version for the 2007 CBS special, Movies Rock, which paid tribute to the strong relationship between films and music.
 In 2009, the song was parodied for an advert for ladies'-only car insurance brand Diamond. 
 T-Bone Burnett's rock version of the song is both campy and cynical, while capturing the essence of the lyric.
 Nadine Coyle  recorded a demo for this song.
 Deanna & The Downbeats, a cabaret-jazz quintet from Portland, Oregon, performs a traditional version of the song that segues into a lounge-swing version of Madonna's "Material Girl".
 In the cartoon Hey Arnold! an episode called "The Beeper Queen" where Helga's mother Miriam sang the parody, "Beepers Are a Girl's Best Friend", in a commercial for Big Bob's Beepers in the same manner as Marilyn Monroe's performance.
 In the episode of The Muppet Show, both Miss Piggy and Carol Channing did the song as a closing number.
 In the episode of Muppets Tonight, both Miss Piggy and Whoopi Goldberg backed up by penguins in a staging similar to the original film did the song as a closing number.
 In the Müller Corner advert from 1997, famed British model, actress, author and activist Joanna Lumley briefly recreates a scene of the song (a.k.a. your "glitzy, glitzy extravagant side") although she does not sing at all during the "Candy Corner" segment of the ad.
 In the 100th episode of Gossip Girl, titled "G.G.", Serena Van der Woodsen (portrayed by Blake Lively) has a dream in which she is Marilyn Monroe and sings "Diamonds Are a Girl's Best Friend".
 In the music video for her single "Material Girl" (1985), Madonna emulates the scene in which Marilyn Monroe sang the song. She also included a snippet of the song during selected shows of her Rebel Heart Tour (2015-2016), following a cover of "La Vie en rose".
 Christina Aguilera also did the song on her first featured film Burlesque (2010). Kristen Bell and Julianne Hough first lip-synched Marilyn's version, then Christina finished it with her own vocals.
 The Puppini Sisters sing a version on their 2011 album Hollywood
 The song is performed by the female Glee Cast in the TV show Glee, in the 2013 episode "Girls (and Boys) On Film", as a mashup with Madonna's "Material Girl".
 A 2013 episode of Let's Sing and Dance features Kim Woodburn and Rosemary Shrager performing the song.
 Anne Ducros sings the song on her album Either way : from Marilyn to Ella (Naïve, 2013)
 Shirley Bassey and Paloma Faith sing the song for Bassey's album Hello Like Before (2014)
 In 1993, famed British drag queen performer Lily Savage (played by Paul O'Grady) performs a parody of the song called"Argos Is a Girl's Best Friend" in his stand-up comedy video Paying the Rent.
In 2016 pop singer Ariana Grande sang the song at a private party. 
 In the episode of Crazy Ex-Girlfriend titled "All Signs Point To Josh...Or Is It Josh's Friend?", Rebecca Bunch (portrayed by Rachel Bloom) pays homage to the song in the music video The Math of Love Triangles. A reprised version of the song called The Math of Love Quadrangles appears in the episode titled "I Need to Find My Frenemy".
 Saara Aalto performed a mashup of the song with Diamonds Are Forever in Week 8 of the live shows on The X Factor (UK series 13)
 In 2018, a power metal band from Germany named Powerwolf performs a play on words title of the song called "Demons Are a Girl's Best Friend".
 The song "Diamonds" by Megan Thee Stallion and Normani from the soundtrack to the film Birds of Prey (2020), interpolates the refrain "diamonds are a girl's best friend" throughout the chorus; in the film, Harley Quinn (portrayed by Margot Robbie) also performs part of the original song while dressed as Monroe.

References

External links
 Video of "Diamonds Are a Girl's Best Friend," Turner Classic Movies
 Recording of "Diamonds Are a Girl's Best Friend" by Ethel Merman from National Public Radio in Windows Media Audio format

1949 songs
Songs from musicals
Marilyn Monroe songs
Songs with music by Jule Styne
Songs with lyrics by Leo Robin
Eartha Kitt songs